Chungmugong Yi Sun-sin class destroyers (Hanja: 忠武公李舜臣級驅逐艦) are multipurpose destroyers of the Republic of Korea Navy. The lead ship of this class, ROKS Chungmugong Yi Sunsin, was launched in May 2002 and commissioned in December 2003. Chungmugong Yi Sun-sin-class destroyers were the second class of ships to be produced in the Republic of Korea Navy's destroyer mass-production program named Korean Destroyer eXperimental, which paved the way for the navy to become a blue-water navy. Six ships were launched by Hyundai Heavy Industries and Daewoo Shipbuilding & Marine Engineering in four years.

Weapon systems
The ships have a 32-cell strike-length Mk 41 VLS for SM-2 Block IIIA area-air defence missiles, one 21-round RAM inner-layer defence missile launcher, one 30 mm Goalkeeper close-in weapon system, one Mk 45 Mod 4 127 mm gun, eight Harpoon anti-ship missiles and two triple 324 mm anti-submarine torpedo tubes. 

The electronics suite includes one Raytheon AN/SPS-49(V)5 2D long-range radar (LRR), one Thales Nederland MW08 target indication 3D radar (TIR), two Thales Nederland STIR240 fire-control radars with OT-134A Continuous Wave Illumination (CWI) transmitters, an SLQ-200(V)K SONATA electronic warfare system and a KDCOM-II combat management system which is derived from the Royal Navy Type 23 frigate's SSCS combat management system. BAE Systems WDS Mk 14 originally developed for the US Navy's New Threat Upgrade evaluates threats, prioritizes them, and engages them in order with SM-2.

On the 4th unit, ROKS Wang Geon, the 32-cell Mk 41 VLS is moved to the left and an indigenous VLS named K-VLS is installed on the right. The ship's forward part is spacious enough to take a 56-cell Mk 41 VLS.

Design
The KDX-II is part of a much larger build up program aimed at turning the ROKN into a blue-water navy. It is said to be the first stealthy major combatant in the ROKN and was designed to significantly increase the ROKN's capabilities.

Ships in the class

Gallery

Variants

KDX-IIA 

KDX-IIA is a proposed variant of the KDX-II. It will be armed with the advanced Aegis Combat System and will have enhanced features of KDX-II such as stealth. The ship has been offered to the Indian Navy.

Arsenal ship 
On August 14, 2019, the Ministry of National Defense unveiled a five year defense plan between 2020 and 2024. The defense plan called for two new naval projects to be developed: the LPX-II-Class Aircraft Carrier and an arsenal ship. The design of the arsenal ship is said to be based on the KDX-II destroyer and is expected to be completed by the late 2020s.

See also
List of naval ship classes in service
List of active Republic of Korea Navy ships
Korean Destroyer eXperimental
Cheonghae Unit

References

Further reading

Destroyer classes